Group D of the 2021 FIFA Arab Cup took place from 1 to 7 December 2021. The group consisted of Algeria, Egypt, Lebanon and Sudan.

The top two teams, Egypt and Algeria, advanced to the quarter-finals.

Teams

Standings 

In the quarter-finals:
Egypt advanced to play against Jordan (runners-up of Group C).
Algeria advanced to play against Morocco (winners of Group C).

Matches 
All times listed are local time.

Algeria vs Sudan

Egypt vs Lebanon 
Right from the start, Egypt dominated possession, holding 76% of the ball in the first 15 minutes. Despite their dominance on the ball, they could not break through Lebanon's defence, having to resort to harmless crosses and long-distance shots. The first dangerous chance of the game came in the 33rd minute, when Egypt's Ahmed Hegazi headed from Mostafa Fathi's free kick, with Lebanon's Mostafa Matar saving the shot; El Wensh's rebound was cleared off the line by Felix Michel Melki. At half time, the result was 0–0, with Egypt incapable of capitalising from a couple of attacking opportunities. Matar proved decisive once again in the second half, saving a one-on-one attack from Afsha. It was Afsha who broke the deadlock in the 71st minute through a penalty, after Ahmed Abou El Fotouh was brought down inside the penalty area by Alexander Michel Melki. In the final 20 minutes, Lebanon modestly attempted to equalise in vain.

Lebanon vs Algeria 
Despite Algeria dominating play, Lebanon brought the first half to a goalless draw thanks to their defending, most notably through their goalkeeper Mostafa Matar and defender Alexander Michel Melki. The second half initially proceeded in a similar fashion to the first, until Youcef Belaïli was brought down in the box by Hussein El Dor; Yacine Brahimi converted the subsequent penalty in the 69th minute. Lebanon reacted from the conceded goal, attempting attacks of their own. In the 78th minute, Houssem Eddine Mrezigue of Algeria was sent off, before Lebanon's Kassem El Zein also got a second yellow card, reducing both teams to 10 men in the final minutes. Following a missed chance by Baghdad Bounedjah one-on-one against the goalkeeper, Algeria doubled their lead in added time after Tayeb Meziani scored from a counter attack.

Sudan vs Egypt

Algeria vs Egypt

Lebanon vs Sudan 
Lebanon began the first half strong, with Sudanese goalkeeper Ali Abu Eshrein saving a shot from Rabih Ataya and a close-range header from Maher Sabra. Sudan's only attempts did not threaten Lebanon's goal. Ataya was sent off in the 62nd minute, reducing Lebanon to 10 men. Both Lebanon and Sudan came close to scoring in the 70th and 75th minute respectively, with Fadel Antar and Mohamed Ering having their close-range shots saved. Sudan's Ahmed Wadah received a red card in the 76th minute and both teams headed into the last 14 minutes with 10 men each. Lebanon gained the lead the same minute, with Abu Eshrein punching the subsequent free kick cross into his own net. It proved to be the only goal of the game, which ended in a 1–0 win for Lebanon.

Notes

References

External links
 

2021 FIFA Arab Cup
2021–22 in Algerian football
2021–22 in Egyptian football
2021–22 in Lebanese football
2021–22 in Sudanese football